Remembering Leadbelly is the final studio album Long John Baldry completed in his lifetime. The album serves as a tribute to Baldry's musical hero Lead Belly with songs he either wrote or is known for. The album was released on November 13, 2001 in North America and on August 12, 2002 internationally.

Track listing 

 "Lining Track" - 1:49
 "Gallows Pole" - 2:42
 "Midnight Special" - 3:29
 "Take This Hammer" - 3:28
 "Rock Island Line" - 2:50
 "Good Morning Blues" - 3:45
 "Go Down Old Hannah" - 0:55
 "Birmingham Jail" - 2:52
 "Here Rattler" - 2:14
 "Easy Rider Blues" - 3:09
 "We're In The Same Boat Brother" - 3:33
 "John Hardy" - 2:30
 "Digging My Potatoes" - 3:10
 "On A Christmas Day" - 2:50
 "Mary Don't You Weep" - 2:35
 "We Shall Walk Through The Valley" - 3:42
 "Alan Lomax Interview" - 5:56
 "Long John Baldry Interview" - 6:36

Personnel 

Long John Baldry - vocals, 12-string guitar
Kathi McDonald - vocals
Hans Stamer - vocals, national steel guitar, harmonica, jews harp, trumpet
Chris Nordquist - drums, hans-on drums, finger cymbals
John Lee Sanders - piano, organ, keyboard tuba, keyboard accordion, vocals, harmonica & other keyboards
Andreas Schuld - acoustic guitar, electric guitar, ukulele, Russian zither, e-bow, percussion, claps, foot, national steel, vocals, slide
Norm Fisher - acc. bass
Jesse Zubot - fiddle, mandolin, violin
Butch Coulter - harmonica
Tom Colclough - clarinet
Sybel Thrasher - vocals
Tyee Montessori Elementary School - backing vocals 'On A Christmas Day'.
Produced by Andreas Schuld for Stony Plain Records
Executive producer: Holger Peterson 
Recorded at Music Lab Recording, Sebastian and Dolly's Hutch, Skeena's Place, all Vancouver, Canada
Butch Coulter was recorded at Halve Recording Studios, Hamburg, Germany
Mastering: Peter Moore, MDI Productions, Toronto
Bonus track interviews by Holger Peterson
Special thanks to Alan Lomax for making himself available at the 1993 W.C. Handy Awards in Memphis, Tennessee

References

2001 albums
Long John Baldry albums
Stony Plain Records albums